Sternoharpya is a monotypic beetle genus in the family Cerambycidae described by Per Olof Christopher Aurivillius in 1913. Its only species, Sternoharpya stictica, was described by the same author in the same year.

References

Sternotomini
Beetles described in 1913
Monotypic beetle genera